This is a list of electoral divisions and wards in the ceremonial county of Gloucestershire in South West England. All changes since the re-organisation of local government following the passing of the Local Government Act 1972 are shown. The number of councillors elected for each electoral division or ward is shown in brackets.

County council

Gloucestershire
Electoral Divisions from 1 April 1974 (first election 12 April 1973) to 2 May 1985:

Electoral Divisions from 2 May 1985 to 5 May 2005:

† minor boundary changes in 1991

Electoral Divisions from 5 May 2005 to 2 May 2013:

† minor boundary changes in 2009

Electoral Divisions from 2 May 2013 to present:

Unitary authority council

South Gloucestershire
Wards from 1 April 1996 (first election 4 May 1995) to 6 May 1999:

Wards from 6 May 1999 to 3 May 2007:

Wards from 3 May 2007 to 2 May 2019:

Wards from 2 May 2019 to present:

District councils

Cheltenham
Wards from 1 April 1974 (first election 7 June 1973) to 5 May 1983:

Wards from 5 May 1983 to 2 May 2002:

Wards from 2 May 2002 to present:

Cotswold
Wards from 1 April 1974 (first election 7 June 1973) to 3 May 1979:

Wards from 3 May 1979 to 1 May 2003:

† minor boundary changes in 1991

Wards from 1 May 2003 to 7 May 2015:

† minor boundary changes in 2007

Wards from 7 May 2015 to present:

Forest of Dean
Wards from 1 April 1974 (first election 7 June 1973) to 5 May 1983:

Wards from 5 May 1983 to 1 May 2003:

Wards from 1 May 2003 to 2 May 2019:

Wards from 2 May 2019 to present:

Gloucester
Wards from 1 April 1974 (first election 7 June 1973) to 3 May 1979:

Wards from 3 May 1979 to 2 May 2002:

† minor boundary changes in 1991

Wards from 2 May 2002 to 5 May 2016:

Wards from 5 May 2016 to present:

Stroud
Wards from 1 April 1974 (first election 7 June 1973) to 5 May 1983:

Wards from 5 May 1983 to 2 May 2002:

† minor boundary changes in 1991

Wards from 2 May 2002 to 5 May 2016:

† minor boundary changes in 2008

Wards from 5 May 2016 to present:

Tewkesbury
Wards from 1 April 1974 (first election 7 June 1973) to 5 May 1983:

Wards from 5 May 1983 to 1 May 2003:

† minor boundary changes in 1991

Wards from 1 May 2003 to 2 May 2019:

Wards from 2 May 2019 to present:

Former county council

Avon
Electoral Divisions from 1 April 1974 (first election 12 April 1973) to 7 May 1981:

Electoral Divisions from 7 May 1981 to 1 April 1996 (county abolished):

Former district councils

Kingswood
Wards from 1 April 1974 (first election 7 June 1973) to 6 May 1976:

Wards from 6 May 1976 to 7 May 1987:

Wards from 7 May 1987 to 1 April 1996 (district abolished):

Northavon
Wards from 1 April 1974 (first election 7 June 1973) to 6 May 1976:

Wards from 6 May 1976 to 1 April 1996 (district abolished):

Electoral wards by constituency

Cheltenham
All Saints, Battledown, Benhall and The Reddings, Charlton Kings, Charlton Park, College, Hesters Way, Lansdown, Leckhampton, Oakley, Park, Pittville, St Mark’s, St Paul’s, St Peter’s, Springbank, Up Hatherley, Warden Hill.

Filton and Bradley Stoke
Almondsbury, Bradley Stoke Baileys Court, Bradley Stoke Bowsland, Bradley Stoke Sherbourne, Downend, Filton, Patchway, Pilning and Severn Beach, Staple Hill, Stoke Gifford, Winterbourne.

Forest of Dean
Alvington, Aylburton and West Lydney, Awre, Berry Hill, Blaisdon and Longhope, Bream, Bromesberrow and Dymock, Christchurch and English Bicknor, Churcham and Huntley, Cinderford East, Cinderford West, Coleford Central, Coleford East, Hartpury, Hewelsfield and Woolaston, Highnam with Haw Bridge, Littledean and Ruspidge, Lydbrook and Ruardean, Lydney East, Lydney North, Mitcheldean and Drybrook, Newent Central, Newland and St Briavels, Newnham and Westbury, Oxenhall and Newent North East, Pillowell, Redmarley, Tibberton, Tidenham.

Gloucester
Abbey, Barnwood, Barton and Tredworth, Elmbridge, Grange, Hucclecote, Kingsholm and Wotton, Matson and Robinswood, Moreland, Podsmead, Quedgeley Fieldcourt, Quedgeley Severn Vale, Tuffley, Westgate.

Kingswood
Bitton, Hanham, Kings Chase, Longwell Green, Oldland Common, Parkwall, Rodway, Siston, Woodstock.

Stroud
Amberley and Woodchester, Berkeley, Bisley, Cainscross, Cam East, Cam West, Central, Chalford, Coaley and Uley, Dursley, Eastington and Standish, Farmhill and Paganhill, Hardwicke, Nailsworth, Over Stroud, Painswick, Rodborough, Severn, Slade, Stonehouse, The Stanleys, Thrupp, Trinity, Uplands, Upton St Leonards, Vale, Valley.

Tewkesbury
Ashchurch with Walton Cardiff, Badgeworth, Brockworth, Churchdown Brookfield, Churchdown St John’s, Cleeve Grange, Cleeve Hill, Cleeve St Michael’s, Cleeve West, Coombe Hill, Hucclecote, Innsworth with Down Hatherley, Isbourne, Longlevens, Northway, Oxenton Hill, Prestbury, Shurdington, Swindon Village, Tewkesbury Newtown, Tewkesbury Prior’s Park, Tewkesbury Town With Mitton, Twyning, Winchcombe.

The Cotswolds
Ampney-Coln, Avening, Beacon-Stow, Blockley, Bourton-on-the-Water, Campden-Vale, Chedworth, Churn Valley, Cirencester Beeches, Cirencester Chesterton, Cirencester Park, Cirencester Stratton-Whiteway, Cirencester Watermoor, Ermin, Fairford, Fosseridge, Grumbolds Ash, Hampton, Kempsford-Lechlade, Kingswood, Minchinhampton, Moreton-in-Marsh, Northleach, Rissingtons, Riversmeet, Sandywell, Tetbury, Thames Head, Three Rivers, Water Park.

Thornbury and Yate
Alveston, Boyd Valley, Charfield, Chipping Sodbury, Cotswold Edge, Dodington, Frampton Cotterell, Ladden Brook, Severn, Thornbury North, Thornbury South, Westerleigh, Yate Central, Yate North, Yate West.

See also
List of parliamentary constituencies in Gloucestershire

References

Politics of Gloucestershire
Gloucestershire